Viva Max! is a 1969 comedy film directed by Jerry Paris and starring Peter Ustinov, Jonathan Winters and John Astin. The film was written by Elliott Baker and based on the 1966 novel of the same name by James Lehrer.

Plot

Riding a white horse, Brigadier General Maximilian Rodrigues de Santos of the army of Mexico arrives at a United States border crossing with a small company of soldiers on foot. He claims to be leading his men to Laredo, Texas to march in a parade on George Washington's birthday.  The soldiers' destination is actually San Antonio, where the general intends to carry out a quixotic mission to "re-occupy" the Alamo. None of his men are aware of his plans, but without argument they do whatever they are told by Max's devoted Sergeant Valdez.

Disguising himself in an ill-fitting suit as a tourist, Max goes on ahead and takes a guided tour of the Alamo. In the gift shop, he encounters an attractive young blonde, Paula, who, when she isn't selling postcards, is a radical student activist.  He returns to his men and, after racing through the streets of San Antonio, they seize control of the fort, taking Paula and two other Americans as their prisoners. Max places a call to the local authorities, telling police chief Sylvester that the flag of Mexico now flies above this piece of hallowed Texas ground.  Sylvester doesn't take him seriously at first, but quickly discovers that Max is an actual Army general and that everything else he has claimed is true. The chief goes to the Alamo to meet Max in person, using the passwords "John Wayne" and "Richard Widmark" to gain entry. Max instructs him to contact the Pentagon and report the fort to be back under Mexico's control.

As Max will only negotiate with another general, Sylvester calls on Billy Joe Hallson, a brigadier general of the state's National Guard, whose day job is running a mattress store.  Max is unimpressed.  A low-level bureaucrat from Washington condescendingly promises that if Max leaves quietly the United States will not take this "invasion" too seriously and mocks Mexico as "not exactly the Soviet Union." To which Max announces he will hold the Alamo for thirteen days in response to the snub.

Paula sees Max as a heroic revolutionary but he tells her his only reason for the invasion was to impress his girlfriend back home who told him that his men wouldn't follow him into a brothel.  A three-star U.S. Army general named Lacomber arrives to take charge. A company of his men scale the wall and enter the fort, but without ammunition, so as to avoid bloodshed and an international incident. It turns out Max's men are not carrying ammo, either, but the Americans fall for Max's bluff to open fire and promptly surrender. Max celebrates by doing a Mexican hat dance.

Paula brings the general back to earth by explaining that she has learned his soldiers follow him only because Valdez shoots any who do not obey orders. Disheartened, Max decides to wave the white flag of surrender and go peacefully. A private anti-communist militia, who think Max is a front for the Chinese, arrives just as Max is surrendering to Lacomber.  Their leader, whose aunt is one of the hostages, shoots Max in the shoulder. Max bravely orders his unarmed men to attack the armed militia.  His men, for the first time, willingly follow his orders and the militia flee as their leader is arrested.

Max then tells the U.S. authorities that he intends to "advance"—to Mexico. Satisfied at that, Sylvester, Lacomber and Hallson let the Mexican general get back on his horse. He rides out of town triumphantly with his men chanting proudly: "Viva Max!"

Cast

 Peter Ustinov as General Maximillian Rodrigo De Santos aka Max
 Pamela Tiffin as Paula Whitland
 Jonathan Winters as General Billy Joe Hallson
 John Astin as Sergeant Valdez
 Keenan Wynn as General Lacomber
 Harry Morgan as Chief Sylvester
 Alice Ghostley as Hattie
 Larry Hankin as Pedro Romero
 Kenneth Mars as Sam Gillison
 Ann Morgan Guilbert as Edna Miller
 Bill McCutcheon as Desmond Miller
 Gino Conforti as Contreras
 Christopher Ross as Gomez
 Larry Hankin as Romero
 Paul Sand as Moreno
 Don Diamond as Hernandez
 Jack Colvin as Garcia
 Jessica Myerson as Mrs. Dodd
 Ted Gehring as Customs Guard Collins
 Jim B. Smith as Customs Guard Michaels
 Eldon Quick as Quincy

Music
The film's musical styles drift back and forth between the sound of the 'invading' army's military band and the late-1960's pop groove, 
the former during scenes focusing on the movement of Max's forces, and the latter during wider views of the invaders as seen within the surrounding activity of everyday American life going on all around them.  The film credits the music to Hugo Montenegro along with the duo of Ralph Dino & John Sembello, with the ostentatious trumpet solos by virtuoso Al Hirt.

Production
A controversy occurred when The Daughters of the Republic of Texas objected to the filming of the Alamo to the point of staging protests on location.  This caused some scenes to be filmed at an Alamo replica in Brackettville, Texas and interior shots at studios in Italy instead of in San Antonio at the actual Alamo.

Release
The film premiered in San Antonio, Texas on December 18, 1969.

See also
 List of American films of 1969

References

External links
 
 

1969 films
1969 comedy films
1960s English-language films
American comedy films
American political satire films
Films based on American novels
Films directed by Jerry Paris
Films scored by Hugo Montenegro
Films set in Texas
Films shot in Texas
Films shot in San Antonio
1960s American films